Limerick is an unincorporated community in Bureau County, Illinois, United States, located on Illinois Route 26, north of Princeton.

History
The town was laid out in 1857 by George Limerick, a pioneer settler. A post office called Limerick was established that same year, and remained in operation until 1892. Limerick had a meeting house, store, blacksmith, physician, Methodist church, and about 15 to 20 dwellings.

References

Unincorporated communities in Bureau County, Illinois
Unincorporated communities in Illinois
1857 establishments in Illinois
Populated places established in 1857